There were three NASCAR national series in 2007:

2007 NASCAR Nextel Cup Series - The top racing series in NASCAR
2007 NASCAR Busch Series - The second-highest racing series in NASCAR
2007 NASCAR Craftsman Truck Series - The third-highest racing series in NASCAR

 
NASCAR seasons